Lyngby Boldklub is a professional football club based in Lyngby, Denmark, founded in 1921. It is based at Lyngby Stadion. From 1994 to 2001 the club was known as Lyngby FC. The club has won the Danish championship twice (1983 and 1992) and the Danish Cup three times (1984, 1985 and 1990).

History
The club was first founded on 8 April 1906 but it was disbanded again in 1915 due to problems with where they were allowed to play. On 30 March 1921, 30 young people from the football department of Lyngby IF decided to break away and start their own club. They named it Lyngby Boldklub af 1921. For the first few years, they played at Lundtofte Flyveplads, using the flight hangars as locker rooms. In 1949 the club moved to the area where the present-day Lyngby Stadion is located.

Lyngby was the first club in Denmark to wear the club's name on the kits, which happened in 1961. In 1983 the club became Danish champions for the first time and in 1984 the club played in the European Cup losing to Sparta Prague with 1–2,0–0 in the second round after beating KS Elbasani in the first round with 3–0,3–0. In 1986 the club was the first one to win its group in the UEFA Intertoto Cup without loss of points.

The club won its second Danish championship in 1992 on Gentofte Stadion. In 1996 the club was eliminated from the UEFA Cup by Club Brügge, even though playing a 1–1 draw in Belgium. 1996 was also the year when Lyngby's chairmen, Flemming Østergaard and Michael Kjær sold team captain Larsen to FC Copenhagen. The sale sparked harsh protests among the fans. In 1997 Østergaard and Kjær left Lyngby to become chairmen in FC Copenhagen. They were joined by striker Jónsson.

In December 2001 the club went bankrupt and was forced to finish the season using only amateur players. Hardly surprising, the team finished the season in last place and was subsequently relegated an additional two leagues due to the bankruptcy. As a result, the team went straight from playing in the Superliga to playing in the amateur league Danmarksserien, just below the three Danish pro leagues. In 2003 the team was promoted to the 2nd Division (the third best league), as winner of Danmarksserien, and on 18 June 2005 the team gained promotion to the 1st Division by finishing 3rd in the 2nd Division.

In the 2006–07 season the team won the Danish 1st Division thus returning to the top flight only five and a half seasons after going bankrupt. Another highlight of the 2006–07 season occurred on 12 April 2007 as Lyngby advanced to the semi-finals of the Danish Cup for the first time in several years, by winning 1–0 against AC Horsens on Lyngby Stadion.

Lyngby achieved a third place in the 2016-17 season, just a season after being promoted from the 1. Division. In the second half of the 2017-18 season, however, the club experienced financial difficulties, due to irregularities at the club owner, Hellerup Finans, which later went bankrupt. This led to the departure of several key players, before, on 9 February 2018, the club was bought and saved by a group of local business people and fans known collectively as Friends of Lyngby. This was not enough for Lyngby to hold its place in the Superliga, as the club lost two play-off matches against 1. Division number 3, Vendsyssel FF, being relegated to 1. Division. Just over a year later, on 2 June 2019, fortunes were reversed, as Lyngby, finishing 3rd in 1. Division, won 3-2 on aggregate against Vendsyssel FF, securing its re-promotion to the top flight.

Honours
Danish Champions
 Winner (2): 1983, 1991–92
 Runners-up (3): 1981, 1985, 1991
 3rd place (4): 1984, 1988, 1989, 2016–17
Danish Cup
 Winner (3): 1983–84, 1984–85, 1989–90
 Runners-up (2): 1969–70, 1979–80
Danish 1st Division
 Winner (2): 2006–07, 2015–16
 Runners-up (3): 1979, 2009–10, 2021–22
 3rd place (3): 2005–06, 2014–15, 2018–19
Zealand Series
 Winner (9): 1946–47, 1952–53, 1956–57, 1959, 1969‡, 1973‡, 1975‡, 1980‡, 2005‡
 Runners-up (4): 1941–42, 1943–44, 1948–49, 1949–50

‡: Won by reserve team

Achievements
23 seasons in the Highest Danish League
7 seasons in the Second Highest Danish League
17 seasons in the Third Highest Danish League

European record

Players

Current squad

Youth players in use

Out on loan

Former players

Among former players are former Danish internationals Flemming Christensen, John Helt, Klaus Berggreen, Ronnie Ekelund, Torben Frank, Jakob Friis-Hansen, Henrik Larsen, Miklos Molnar, Claus "Kuno" Christiansen, Carsten Fredgaard, Claus Jensen, Bent Christensen, Peter Nielsen, Niclas Jensen, Dennis Rommedahl, Thomas Kristensen, Morten Nordstrand and Mikkel Beckmann. Swedish international Marcus Allbäck briefly played for the club in the late 1990s. Four Lyngby players were on the Danish team that won the 1992 European Football Championship, while Rommedahl and Bechmann were included in the Danish squad for the World Cup in South Africa, 2010.

Youth players
Lyngby Boldklub is also renowned for its youth program, and several current and former A-international players started their careers in Lyngby. These include Yussuf Poulsen, Frederik Sørensen, Christian Gytkjær, Andreas Bjelland, Lasse Schöne, Morten Nordstrand, Dennis Rommedahl and Thomas Kristensen. Though Niclas Jensen started his career in B 93 his career didn't really take off until he joined Lyngby in 1992 aged 18.

Old boys
In the mid-2000s, the club's Old Boys team was among the best in Denmark featuring several well-known players such as Michael Laudrup, Brian Laudrup and aforementioned Berggreen and Larsen.

Season-by-season results

Green denotes promotion, red denotes relegation.-->

Former coaches
 Jørgen Hvidemose (1981–87)
 Hans Brun Larsen (1987)
 Kim Lyshøj (1987–90)
 Kent Karlsson (1991–92)
 Michael Schäfer (1992–95)
 Benny Lennartsson (1995–98)
 Poul Hansen (1998–01)
 Hasse Kuhn (2001–03)
 Bent Christensen (2003–05)
 Kasper Hjulmand (2006–08)
 Henrik Larsen (2008–09)
 Niels Frederiksen (2009–13)
 Johan Lange (2013)
 Jack Majgaard (2013–15)
 Søren Hermansen (2015) (interim)
 David Nielsen (2015–17)
 Thomas Nørgaard (2017–18)
 Mark Strudal (2018)
 Christian Nielsen (2018–20)
 Carit Falch (2020–21)
 Freyr Alexandersson (2021–Present)

References

External links
 Official website
 Official fansite

 
Association football clubs established in 1921
Lyngby
Football clubs in Copenhagen
1921 establishments in Denmark